Stanley Evans Borleske (August 20, 1888 – January 3, 1967) was an American football, basketball, and baseball player and coach.  He served as the head football coach at North Dakota Agricultural College—now North Dakota State University (1919–1921, 1923–1924, 1928) and at Fresno State Teachers College—now Fresno State University (1929–1932), compiling a career college football record of 36–36–7.  Borleske's 1930 Fresno State football squad is one of only three in program history to complete a season undefeated.  Borleske coached basketball at North Dakota Agricultural from 1919 to 1922 and at Fresno State from 1934 to 1939, tallying a mark of 75–75.  He was also the head baseball coach at the two schools, from 1920 to 1921 and 1923 to 1924 at North Dakota Agricultural and from 1930 to 1941 at Fresno State, amassing a record of 99–58–1.

Borleske selected the North Dakota Agricultural's mascot, the bison.  He grew up in Spokane, Washington and attended Whitman College, where he played football and basketball and ran track during the 1907–08 academic year.  He played football at the University of Michigan from 1908 to 1910.

In 1964, Borleske was inducted into the Fresno County Athletic Hall of Fame. He died in Whittier, California in 1967 of an apparent heart attack at age 78.

Head coaching record

Football

See also
 List of college football head coaches with non-consecutive tenure

References

External links
 

1888 births
1967 deaths
American football ends
American men's basketball players
Basketball coaches from Washington (state)
Dallas Giants players
Fresno State Bulldogs baseball coaches
Fresno State Bulldogs football coaches
Fresno State Bulldogs men's basketball coaches
Michigan Wolverines football players
North Dakota State Bison athletic directors
North Dakota State Bison baseball coaches
North Dakota State Bison football coaches
North Dakota State Bison men's basketball coaches
Whitman Fighting Missionaries football players
Whitman Blues men's basketball players
College men's basketball head coaches in the United States
College men's track and field athletes in the United States
People from Albert Lea, Minnesota
Players of American football from Spokane, Washington
Basketball players from Spokane, Washington